Guro Digital Complex Station is a station on the Seoul Subway Line 2. This station will also become a station on the Sin Ansan Line in the future. The area nearby was used as a filming location for several Korean films, including The Yellow Sea by Na Hong-jin.

When the Shinansan Line opens in the future, it will be a transfer station. The station is located at the intersection of Guro-gu, Yeongdeungpo-gu, Dongjak-gu and Gwanak-gu, and in 2009, Guro Digital Complex Station was selected as the bus stop in Seoul with the largest number of bus users.

Station layout

References

Railway stations opened in 1984
Seoul Metropolitan Subway stations
Metro stations in Guro District, Seoul
Metro stations in Yeongdeungpo District
1984 establishments in South Korea
20th-century architecture in South Korea